Elections to Kettering Borough Council were held on 3 May 2007. The whole council was up for election with boundary changes since the last election in 2003 reducing the number of seats by nine.  The Conservative Party retained overall control of the council.

Candidates and election issues
Both the Conservative and Labour parties put up candidates in all wards. There were also five Liberal Democrat, four Independent and one Green party candidates.

Major elections issues included refuse collection, recycling and the location of the council offices.

Summary Result

Ward results

See also
 Local Elections in Kettering Borough
 Kettering town

References
May 2007 Election Results: Results by ward 
Kettering Council election 2007 (BBC)

External links
Evening Telegraph coverage of election

2007 English local elections
2007
2000s in Northamptonshire